The 1997 Atlanta mayoral election occurred on November 4, 1997, with a runoff election held on November 25, 1997.

Since no candidate received a majority in the general election, a runoff election was held between the top-two finishers. Incumbent mayor Bill Campbell won reelection in the runoff.

Candidates
Advanced to runoff
Marvin S. Arrington Sr., Atlanta city councilor
Bill Campbell, incumbent mayor

Eliminated in general election
John Genins
Louise T. Hornsby
Jack Jersawitz
Doug Nelson
G.B. Osborne
J. Alley Pat Patrick
Gloria Bromell Tinubu, Atlanta city councilor

Campaign
Ahead of the November 4 election, incumbent Campbell and challenger Arrington exchanged attacks, including personal attacks. Personal attacks between the candidates increased in the runoff. The race was regarded as one of the nastiest mayoral campaigns the city had seen in more than two decades.

The discourse of the runoff campaign, which was between two black candidates, took on racial tones. Former mayor Maynard Jackson, a supporter of Campbell, likened White Republicans, who largely supported Arrington in the election, to "Lester Maddox types", and argued that, if Arrington were elected, it would reverse civil rights progress that the city had made. Arrington denounced such remarks as race baiting. Days later, Arrington attacked Jackson, accusing him of not participating in the civil rights movement, and argued that he had instead been "in Cleveland, passing", which was widely interpreted as meaning that the light skinned Jackson was "passing" as White. Many saw Arrington's remarks as having brought to the surface the political dynamics related to Campbell being a light-skinned black candidate and Arrington being a dark skinned black candidate. After Arrington's remarks sparked outrage, Arrington argued that he had instead meant to say that, during the early days of the civil rights movement, Jackson, "was in Cleveland, passing out dictionaries and encyclopedias." In response to Arrington's remarks, Jackson called Arrington, "an old burned-out, do-nothing, lackluster politician with serious insecurities and hidden angers."

Campbell distributed materials by mail which argued that the, mayor's race "is now a civil rights issue", warning that, "if the ultraconservatives control City Hall we will lose the gains achieved during the last 25 years." Arrington criticized these mailers, arguing that they were code for saying that "White north Atlanta" would control City Hall if Arrington were elected.

Both candidates sought to win the black vote, seen as critical to either candidate's paths to victory in a city where black people comprised two-thirds of the populace.

Campbell's campaign spent roughly $3 million, which was roughly twice what Arrington's campaign spent.

Other campaign issues included crime and the safety of the city's water system.

Turnout for the runoff was considered low.

Results

General election (November 4)

Runoff (November 25)

References

1997 in Atlanta
1997 Georgia (U.S. state) elections
1997 United States mayoral elections
1997